The Ministry of Defence (Abrv: MOD;), is a cabinet-level government department of the Kingdom of Thailand. The ministry controls and manages the Royal Thai Armed Forces to maintain national security, territorial integrity, and national Defence. The armed forces of Thailand are composed of three branches: the Royal Thai Army, Royal Thai Navy, and Royal Thai Air Force.

Although the King of Thailand is the Head of the Royal Thai Armed Forces, his position is only nominal. The ministry and the forces are administered by an appointed politician, the Minister of Defence, a member of the Cabinet of Thailand. The post of minister of Defence has been held by General Prayut Chan-o-cha, who is also prime minister, since 10 July 2019.

History

Initially, the Ministry was called Krom Kalahom and its head was called Samuha Kalahom, and it was charged with the protection of the southern border. It was founded in the Ayutthaya period and was retained throughout the Rattanakosin period. The ministry in its current design was formed in 1887, by the order of King Chulalongkorn, to create a permanent military command. This was a result of the increasing threat posed by Western powers. The ministry was first housed in an old horse-and-elephant stable opposite the Grand Palace. A new European-style building was erected to house it. At first the ministry only commanded the army (founded in 1847), but then it incorporated the navy (founded in 1887), and finally, the air force (founded in 1913). 

In 1914, King Vajiravudh determined that the act providing for invoking martial law, first promulgated by his father in 1907, was not consistent with modern laws of war nor convenient for the preservation of the external or internal security of the state, so it was changed to the modern form that, with minor amendments, continues to be in force.

Structure

Departments

Departmental organisation
 Office of Minister of Defence
 Office of the Permanent Secretary for Defence
 Royal Thai Armed Forces

Associated organizations
Armed Forces Academies Preparatory School
National Defence College of Thailand
Chulachomklao Royal Military Academy
Royal Thai Naval Academy
Navaminda Kasatriyadhiraj Royal Thai Air Force Academy

Other agencies
 Defence Technology Institute (Public Organisation)
 The War Veterans Department
 Bangkok Dock Company

Budget

The military augments its budgets through its ownership of golf courses, racetracks, boxing stadia, and radio and television stations.

List of Ministers

References

External links
Royal Thai Army
Royal Thai Navy
Royal Thai Air Force

 
Military of Thailand
Thailand
Thailand, Defence